Protolira is a genus of sea snails, marine gastropod mollusks in the family Skeneidae.

Species
Species within the genus Protolira include:
 Protolira thorvaldssoni Warén, 1996
 Protolira valvatoides Warén & Bouchet, 1993
Species brought into synonymy
 Protolira thorvaldsoni Warén, 1996: synonym of Protolira thorvaldssoni Warén, 1996

References

 Warén A. & Bouchet P. (1993) New records, species, genera, and a new family of gastropods from hydrothermal vents and hydrocarbon seeps. Zoologica Scripta 22: 1-90.
 Gofas, S.; Le Renard, J.; Bouchet, P. (2001). Mollusca, in: Costello, M.J. et al. (Ed.) (2001). European register of marine species: a check-list of the marine species in Europe and a bibliography of guides to their identification. Collection Patrimoines Naturels, 50: pp. 180–213

 
Skeneidae
Gastropod genera